Punta Tombo is a peninsula into the Atlantic Ocean  south of Trelew in Chubut Province, Argentina, where there is a large colony of Magellanic penguins - the largest such colony in Argentina. It is a short distance north of Camarones.

Natural reserve 
The  Punta Tombo Provincial Reserve has been protected since 1979, according to a provincial decree, and it is one of the main tourist attractions in Chubut. Punta Tombo is part of the new marine national park at Golfo San Jorge.

A variety of wildlife can be seen in the area, including a colony of Magellanic penguins, other seabirds (mainly gulls and cormorants), rheas and guanacos. 

In the 19th Century, British mariners knew Punta Tombo as "Tombas".

Magellanic penguin colony 
The Magellanic penguin colony at Punta Tombo is exposed to overfishing of prey species and oil spills, many of which go unreported. One such spill in August of 1991 claimed the lives of at least 16,000 Magellanic penguins, some of which made landfall at Punta Tombo in an oiled condition. The spill coincided with the population's breeding migration. More penguins were expected to have died at sea. The colony's population exceeded 1,000,000 birds in 1982. Between 1994 and 1995, the colony's population dropped 37%. In 1999, the colony was an estimated 400,000 birds.

In 2017, over a million birds were present at the colony.

See also
Punta Ninfas
Península Valdés

Citations and references
Citations

References
Clayton, Jane M. (2014) Ships employed in the South Sea Whale Fishery from Britain: 1775-1815: An alphabetical list of ships. (Berforts Group).

External links
Puntatombo.com
Destinations
Patagonia.com.ar 
Punta Tombo, images 

Headlands of Argentina
Landforms of Chubut Province
Protected areas of Chubut Province